Jan Radziwiłł (1492 most likely in Goniądz – January 1542 in Chochlo) was the Deputy Cup-Bearer of Lithuania and the Elder of Samogitia since 1535 until death. He was a grandson of Mikalojus Radvilaitis and the only son of Mikołaj Radziwiłł. He had no male heirs therefore he was the last from the Goniądz-Meteliai Radziwiłł family line.

1492 births
1542 deaths
Jan 1492
People from Mońki County
Elders of Samogitia